The British International School of Moscow (BIS) is a private international school in Moscow, Russia. The school was founded in 1994 to meet the needs of expatriate or Russian parents who wished for their children to be taught in English using the English National Curriculum, as adapted to meet the needs of international pupils.

Overview
The majority of students are from Russia, but many are from around the world. The school is split into two regions, with some schools being in the 'North' and the others in the 'South'. These campuses are based in many cases are directly adjacent to or close to large industrial areas.

Campuses
The School has 6 campuses.

BISM 1 (Infant Education-Voikovskaya region of Moscow). The Northern Infant School caters for children between the ages of 3 and 7. Its  programme   incorporates all subjects according to the English Curriculum Foundation Stage (Nursery/Reception classes) and Key Stage One (Years 1 & 2). The school also has a Russian language programme that begins at Year 1 and is taught by Russian teachers on three levels to accommodate   native and non-native Russian students.

BISM 2 (Primary Education-Voikovskaya region of Moscow). The Northern Campus Junior School caters for children between the ages of 6 and 11.  The school follows the English National Curriculum adapted  to meet the needs of a mobile international community.

BISM 3 (Secondary Education-Yasenevo region of Moscow). The Southern Secondary Campus follows the National Curriculum for England and is an IBO World School. The school offers a complete educational programme for children ages 11–18. After completing Year 11, pupils can stay on to study the International Baccalaureate Diploma. Pupils come from currently 45 nationalities.  The school has a well equipped ICT facility, including interactive whiteboards to supplement teaching.

BISM 5 (Primary and Secondary Education Russian style, Profsoyuznaya region of Moscow). The Russian curriculum school of the British International School is located in the South-West of Moscow. The school provides education in the Russian curriculum with elements of the British system, including the teaching of English by native speakers.

BISM 7 (Secondary Education – Voikovskaya region). The Northern Senior Campus in Voikovskaya offers an educational programme for children ages 11–18. After completing Year 11, pupils may stay within BISM to study the British A-level Programme in the Northern campus or the International Baccalaureate Diploma programme at the Southern School 3 campus.

BISM 9 (Primary Education-Nakhimovskiy prospekt, Profsouznaya region of Moscow). School 9 is located in central south west Moscow next to metro station "Profsoyuznaya". Students may enrol in  an English Curriculum primary school (Reception, Key stages 1&2) for pupils aged 3–11.

See also
 Russian Embassy School in London - Russian school in London

References

British international schools in Russia
International schools in Moscow
1994 establishments in Russia
Educational institutions established in 1994